Abdul Mannan ( – 4 August 2020) was a Bangladesh Nationalist Party politician and a former Jatiya Sangsad member representing the Dhaka-2 constituency.

Career
Mannan was elected to parliament from Dhaka-2 as a Bangladesh Nationalist Party candidate in 1991, 1996, and 2001. He served as the State Minister of Civil Aviation and Tourism. He was an adviser to former Prime Minister and chairperson of Bangladesh Nationalist Party, Khaleda Zia. In 2010, he was made the President of Dhaka District Unit of Bangladesh Nationalist Party.

References

2020 deaths
People from Dhaka
Bangladesh Nationalist Party politicians
5th Jatiya Sangsad members
6th Jatiya Sangsad members
7th Jatiya Sangsad members
8th Jatiya Sangsad members
State Ministers of Tourism and Civil Aviation (Bangladesh)
Year of birth missing
1940s births